Brucea javanica (also known as Macassar kernels) is a shrub in the family Simaroubaceae. The specific epithet  is from the Latin, meaning "of Java". Other common names in English include Java brucea and kosam.

Description
The tiny flowers (1.5--2 mm in diameter) are greenish white to greenish red or purple and occur in panicles. There are separate male and female flowers on each shrub, making it a monoecious species. The flower anthers are typically red. It typically flowers in June and July and sets fruit in July and August. When ripe they are a black-gray color that becomes wrinkled when dry. The seed is whitish yellow and covered with an oily membrane. It has compound leaves with typically 7--9 (but range from 3--15) ovate to ovate-lanceolate leaflets with serrate margins. Each leaflet is 20–40 cm long at maturity and comes to a point at the apex. The leaves are covered with fine hairs that are most prominent at the veins and on the undersides of the leaves. All parts of the plant are intensely bitter.

Distribution and habitat
Brucea javanica grows naturally from Sri Lanka and India to China, Indochina, Malesia, New Guinea and Australia. Its habitat includes open areas, secondary forest and sometimes sand dunes. In Australia it grows as an understory tree from sea-level to  altitude.

Medicinal use
The fruit Brucea javanica was first written about as medicine in the Chinese medical monograph Omissions from the Grand Materia Medica, written in 1765. It contains quassinoid compounds called bruceolides that are anticancer and antiparasitic. It is traditionally used to treat dysentery and malaria, though no clinical trials have been published confirming efficacy for these conditions despite test tube studies repeatedly showing anti-malarial activity. Moronic acid, another compound found in the plant, shows also potential anti-HIV activity. An injectable oil emulsion form of the plant has been studied in China in controlled trials for treating lung cancer patients combined with chemotherapy, with promising results. More high-quality trials are needed to confirm this use.

References

javanica
Flora of tropical Asia
Flora of China
Flora of Taiwan
Flora of Australia
Plants described in 1753
Taxa named by Carl Linnaeus